Georges Crozier (1882–1944) was a French international footballer who became the first Frenchman to play in England when he joined Fulham of the Southern League in 1904. Eugène Langenove, who signed for Walsall in 1922, was the first French player to play in the Football League.

References

External links
 
 
 Profile at FFF 
 

1882 births
1944 deaths
French footballers
France international footballers
Fulham F.C. players
US Parisienne players
French expatriate footballers
Expatriate footballers in England
French expatriate sportspeople in England
Association football goalkeepers